The common trinket snake (Coelognathus helena) is a nonvenomous constrictor species of colubrid snake native to south Central Asia.

Etymology
The specific name of this snake, helena, is thought to be a reference to Helen of Troy, considered by many to be the epitome of female beauty and the most beautiful woman in the world.

Geographic range
C. helena is found in Sri Lanka, southern India, Pakistan (Shangla), Nepal, and Bangladesh.

Its type locality is "India: Vishakhapatnam" (Daudin, 1803).

Description
See snake scales for terms used.C. helena has the following scalation. The rostral is a little broader than deep, and visible from above. The suture between the internasals is much shorter than that between the prefrontals. The frontal is as long as its distance from the end of the snout, but shorter than the parietals. The loreal is somewhat longer than deep. One large preocular and two postoculars are present. The temporals are arranged 2+2 or 2+3. There are 9 (exceptionally 10 or 11) upper labials, and the fifth and sixth (or fourth, fifth, and sixth) enter the eye. There are 5 or 6 lower labials in contact with the anterior chin shields. The anterior chin shields are as long as or a little longer than the posterior chin shields.

The dorsal scales are in 23 to 27 rows at midbody, smooth, or feebly keeled on the posterior part of the body and on the tail. The ventrals number 220-265; the anal plate is entire; and the subcaudals number 75-94.

The young are pale brown above, with black crossbands, each crossband enclosing four to six white ocelli. The adults are darker brown, with a transverse series of squarish black spots, or with more or less distinct traces of the color pattern of the young. There is a vertical black streak below the eye, and an oblique black streak behind the eye. Some specimens have a white, black-edged collar; others have two black longitudinal streaks on the head; and others are intermediate in this respect. The lower parts are yellowish, with or without a few small black spots, sometimes with a more or less distinct festooned marking on each side.

Subspecies
Three subspecies of C. helena are recognized as being valid, including the nominotypical subspecies. C. h. helena C. h. monticollaris C. h.  nigriangularis Nota bene: A trinomial authority in parentheses indicates that the subspecies was originally described in a genus other than Coelognathus.

Habitat
A terrestrial snake, C. helena lives in termite mounds, but also prefers low heights, old trees, wood piles, around old houses, dense vegetation, etc.

Diet
The trinket snake feeds on rodents, other small mammals, and lizards.

Behaviour
Diurnal and highly active, C. helena is noted for its temper and will strike repeatedly if molested. The males of this species are generally more aggressive than the females. Its bites are often very damaging due to its inward pointing teeth.

Gallery

References

Further reading
Boulenger GA (1894). Catalogue of the Snakes in the British Museum (Natural History). Volume II., Containing the Conclusion of the Colubridæ Aglyphæ. London: Trustees of the British Museum (Natural History). (Taylor and Francis, printers). xi + 382 pp. + Plates I-XX. (Coluber helena, pp. 36–37).
Das I (2002). A Photographic Guide to Snakes and other Reptiles of India. Sanibel Island, Florida: Ralph Curtis Books. 144 pp. . (Coelognathus helena, p. 32).
Daudin FM (1803). Histoire Naturelle Générale et Particulière des Reptiles ... Tome sixième [Volume 6]. Paris: F. Dufart. 447 pp. + Plates LXXI-LXXX. (Coluber helena, new species, pp. 277-280 + Plate LXXVII, figure 1). (in French and Latin).
Helfenberger, Notker (2001). "Phylogenetic relationship of Old World Ratsnakes based on visceral organ topography, osteology, and allozyme variation". Russ. J. Herpetol. (Suppl.), 56 pp.
Kornacker P (1986). "Die indische Schmucknatter ". Herpetofauna 8 (44): 10. (in German).
Kornacker P (1988). "Bemerkungen zur Biologie, Haltung Zucht von Elaphe helena (Daudin 1802)". Herpetofauna 10 (57): 27-33. (in German).
Mehta RS (2003). "Prey-handling behavior of hatchling Elaphe helena (Colubridae)". Herpetologica 59 (4): 469-474.
Niehaus, Guido; Schulz, Klaus-Dieter (1987). "Die hinterasiatischen Kletternattern der Gattung Elaphe. Teil XI Elaphe helena (Daudin, 1803)". Sauria 9 (4): 3-7. (in German).
Schulz K-D (1996). Eine Monographie der Schlangengattung Elaphe Fitzinger. Berg (CH): Bushmaster. 460 pp. (in German).
Schulz K-D (1996). A monograph of the colubrid snakes of the genus Elaphe Fitzinger. Koeltz Scientific Books. 439 pp.
Smith MA (1943). The Fauna of British India, Ceylon and Burma, Including the Whole of the Indo-Chinese Sub-region. Reptilia and Amphibia. Vol. III.—Serpentes. London: Secretary of State for India. (Taylor and Francis, printers). xii + 583 pp. (Elaphe helena, pp. 149–150).
Utiger, Urs; Helfenberger, Notker; Schätti, Beat; Schmidt, Catherine; Ruf, Markus; Ziswiler, Vincent (2002). "Molecular systematics and phylogeny of Old World and New World ratsnakes, Elaphe Auct., and related genera (Reptilia, Squamata, Colubridae)". Russ. J. Herpetol. 9 (2): 105-124.
Wall F (1921). Ophidia Taprobanica or the Snakes of Ceylon. Colombo, Ceylon [Sri Lanka]: Colombo Museum. (H.R. Cottle, Government Printer). xxii + 581 pp. (Coluber helena'', pp. 197–203, Figure 42).

External links

Rat snakes
Reptiles of South Asia
Reptiles of Pakistan
Reptiles described in 1803